Raymond David Bowden (31 July 193729 July 2004) was an Australian Anglican bishop, the eighth Bishop of Bendigo from 1995 to 2002.

Bowden was born in England, educated at Newcastle Boys' High School, trained for ordination at St John's College, Morpeth, and ordained deacon in 1960 and priest in 1961. He began his ordained ministry with curacies in Armidale and West Tamworth. He was the incumbent at Warialda, Savona (New York, United States), Berkeley (California), Glen Innes and Terrigal. He was Archdeacon of the Central Coast from 1985 to 1992; and of Newcastle until his ordination to the episcopate on 6 December 1995.

References

1937 births
People educated at Newcastle Boys' High School
20th-century Anglican bishops in Australia
Anglican bishops of Bendigo
21st-century Anglican bishops in Australia
2004 deaths
Place of death missing